Marius Germinal Boyer (22 September 1885, Marseille24 December 1947, Casablanca) was a French architect active in Casablanca, Morocco.

Biography 
Marius Boyer was admitted to the École nationale supérieure des Beaux-Arts in Paris in 1904.

He moved to Casablanca, then under the authority of the French Protectorate in Morocco, where he worked with Jean Balois.

Notable works 

References 

1885 births
1947 deaths
20th-century French architects
French expatriates in Morocco

Architects from Marseille